William Shane Beardsley (May 13, 1901 – November 21, 1954) was an American politician. He served on the Iowa Senate from 1933 to 1941, and was a member of the Iowa House of Representatives between 1947 and 1949. Beardsley was the 31st Governor of Iowa from 1949 to 1954.

Biography
Beardsley was born in Beacon, Iowa to William and Carrie Shane Beardsley, and grew up in Birmingham, Iowa.  The son of a pharmacist, he attended pharmacy school himself, and established a drugstore in New Virginia, Iowa in 1922.  He was elected to the Iowa Senate, and served from 1933 to 1941.  From 1938 to 1946, he raised cattle and hogs on his farm in New Virginia.  He was appointed to the Iowa House of Representatives in 1947 to fill the term of a Representative who had died, and became a prominent opponent of the labor and education policies of Governor Robert D. Blue, a fellow Republican.  In June 1948, Beardsley successfully challenged Blue in the Republican primary, and went on to an easy victory in the general election.

Beardsley was known for his advocacy of a balanced state budget, and his opposition to the Truman administration's Brannan Plan.  He was reelected in 1950 and 1952, but chose not to run for a fourth term in 1954.  During his tenure the following notable accomplishments were achieved: workmen's compensation benefits were increased; the highway patrol was expanded; anti-gambling laws were sanctioned; roads, schools, and institutions were all advanced; and a World War II veteran's bonus was authorized.

On November 21, 1954, Beardsley was killed in a highway accident on Iowa 60 just north of Des Moines while returning from a visit to his son, Dan Beardsley, a student at Iowa State University in Ames, Iowa.  He is interred at the New Virginia cemetery in New Virginia, Iowa.

References

  National Governors Association biography
 William S. Beardsley at the Iowa General Assembly
 "Popularity in Reverse", TIME, June 21, 1948
 "Governor Beardsley of Iowa Is Killed As His Auto Smashes Into Truck", New York Times, November 22, 1954 (subscription required)
 "Gov. Beardsley, Iowa, killed in auto crash" Lebanon Daily News, November 22, 1954
 "Gov. Beardsley Dies In Auto-Truck Crash" The Daily Nonpareil, November 22, 1954

1901 births
1954 deaths
American pharmacists
Republican Party members of the Iowa House of Representatives
Republican Party Iowa state senators
Republican Party governors of Iowa
Road incident deaths in Iowa
People from Mahaska County, Iowa
People from Birmingham, Iowa
People from Warren County, Iowa
Burials in Iowa
20th-century American politicians